Kelmarsh railway station on the Northampton and Market Harborough railway opened on 16 February 1859 serving the villages of Kelmarsh and Arthingworth, Northamptonshire, England. It was part of the London and North Western Railway. The next station north, Clipston and Oxendon serving the villages of Great Oxendon and Clipston was situated south of Oxendon tunnel. To the south, Lamport was accessed via Kelmarsh tunnel.

The station lost its passenger service on 4 January 1960. The line was re-opened for limited periods after that and not closed completely until 15 August 1981. The Heritage Northampton & Lamport Railway hopes that it may eventually re-open the route.

References

Disused railway stations in Northamptonshire
Railway stations in Great Britain opened in 1859
Railway stations in Great Britain closed in 1960
Former London and North Western Railway stations